Municipal elections were held in Naples on 5 June 2016.

Voting system
The voting system is used for all mayoral elections in Italy, in the city with a population higher than 15,000 inhabitants. Under this system voters express a direct choice for the mayor or an indirect choice voting for the party of the candidate's coalition. If no candidate receives 50% of votes, the top two candidates go to a second round after two weeks. This gives a result whereby the winning candidate may be able to claim majority support, although it is not guaranteed.

The election of the City Council is based on a direct choice for the candidate with a preference vote: the candidate with the majority of the preferences is elected. The number of the seats for each party is determined proportionally.

Parties and candidates
This is a list of the parties (and their respective leaders) which participated in the election.

Opinion polling

Results

According to the Italian electoral law 1993 for the municipalities, if a defeated candidate for mayor obtained over 3% of the votes, the mayoral candidate  is automatically elected communal councillor (Lettieri, Valente and Brambilla); the elected mayor is not a member of municipal council, but De Magistris votes in the municipal council.

See also

References

2016 elections in Italy
Naples
Naples
Naples
June 2016 events in Italy